Mark Dannhoff (born September 7, 1967) is an American basketball coach who serves as head coach for the Potawatomi Fire of The Basketball League (TBL). He has over 30 years of experience.

In November 2021, the Enid Outlaws of TBL announced that the team had hired Danoff as its head coach for the 2022 season. After the 2022 season, he was hired by the Potawatomi Fire for the 2023 season.

References

Living people
1967 births
American men's basketball coaches
Tulane Green Wave men's basketball coaches
Georgia State Panthers men's basketball coaches
Texas A&M–Corpus Christi Islanders men's basketball coaches